is a former Nippon Professional Baseball pitcher.

External links

 Career statistics - NPB.jp 

1974 births
Living people
Baseball people from Mie Prefecture
Aoyama Gakuin University alumni
Japanese baseball players
Nippon Professional Baseball pitchers
Fukuoka Daiei Hawks players
Fukuoka SoftBank Hawks players
Japanese baseball coaches
Nippon Professional Baseball coaches